Khorramabad County is in Lorestan province, Iran. The capital of the county is the city of Khorramabad. At the 2006 census, the county's population was 509,251 in 113,886 households. The following census in 2011 counted 487,167 people in 128,600 households, by which time Dowreh-e Chegeni District and Veysian District had been separated from the county to form Dowreh County. At the 2016 census, the county's population was 506,471 in 144,958 households.

Administrative divisions

The population history and structural changes of Khorramabad County's administrative divisions over three consecutive censuses are shown in the following table. The latest census shows four districts, 17 rural districts, and four cities.

References

 

Counties of Lorestan Province